Saturday, Sunday and Friday, originally titled Sabato, domenica e venerdì, is a 1979 Italian anthology comedy film directed by Castellano & Pipolo, Pasquale Festa Campanile and Sergio Martino.

Plot 
The film is divided into three episodes that have as their theme the love and public relations.

I segment 
Nicholas La Brocca deals with public relations, but he is also an engineer and must accommodate in Italy a beautiful Japanese female engineer, arrived in the Belpaese to bury the ashes of her grandfather, as the old man wanted in the will before die. Nicola and the Japanese girl fall in love, although Nicola already has a girlfriend.

II segment 
The truck driver Mario is convinced from the neighbor Enza to pretend to be married to her. In fact the girl is of Sicilian origin, and for years lives in the city, and knows that the parents want to see her married with children, otherwise they would not approve. So Mario has to bear all weekend the crazy needs of the false Sicilian relatives.

III segment 
Ambroise Constantin is a dancing master who has a luxurious dance school. He is a very rich man and he is revered by his young dancers, except for the rebel girl Jacqueline, who wants to marry the gangster Fred. Ambroise must prevent it.

Cast

Sabato (Saturday) 
 Adriano Celentano: Ambrose Costantin
 Edwige Fenech: Eng. Tokimoto
 Michele Placido: Mario Salvetti
 Lino Banfi: Nicola La Brocca
 Milena Vukotic: Clelia Benelli 
 Lory Del Santo: Baby
 Daniele Vargas: Director of La Brocca
 Gino Pagnani: "Zaikoto" worker 
 Salvatore Baccaro: Gustavo
 Nello Pazzafini: brother of Gustavo
(directed by Sergio Martino)

Domenica (Sunday) 
 Barbara Bouchet: Enza Paternò 
 Michele Placido: Mario Salvetti
 Manuel Zarzo: Camillo Magnaghi
(directed by Pasquale Festa Campanile)

Venerdì (Friday) 
 Adriano Celentano: Ambrose Costantin
 Lova Moor: Jacqueline
 Manuel Gallardo: Fred 
 Salvatore Borgese: scagnozzo del gangster
(directed by Castellano & Pipolo)

Release
Saturday, Sunday and Friday was released in Italy on 20 October 1979.

References

External links

1979 films
1970s Italian-language films
1979 comedy films
Films directed by Sergio Martino
Films directed by Pasquale Festa Campanile
Films directed by Castellano & Pipolo
Films scored by Detto Mariano
Italian anthology films
Italian comedy films
1970s Italian films